In mathematics, logic and computer science, a formal language (a set of finite sequences of symbols taken from a fixed alphabet) is called recursive if it is a recursive subset of the set of all possible finite sequences over the alphabet of the language. Equivalently, a formal language is recursive if there exists a total Turing machine (a Turing machine that halts for every given input) that, when given a finite sequence of symbols as input, accepts it if it belongs to the language and rejects it otherwise. Recursive languages are also called decidable.

The concept of decidability may be extended to other models of computation. For example, one may speak of languages decidable on a non-deterministic Turing machine.  Therefore, whenever an ambiguity is possible, the synonym used for "recursive language" is Turing-decidable language, rather than simply decidable.

The class of all recursive languages is often called R, although this name is also used for the class RP.

All recursive languages are also recursively enumerable. All regular, context-free and context-sensitive languages are recursive.

Definitions 

There are two equivalent major definitions for the concept of a recursive language:

 A recursive formal language is a recursive subset in the set of all possible words over the alphabet of the language.
 A recursive language is a formal language for which there exists a Turing machine that, when presented with any finite input string, halts and accepts if the string is in the language, and halts and rejects otherwise. The Turing machine always halts: it is known as a decider and is said to decide the recursive language.

By the second definition, any decision problem can be shown to be decidable by exhibiting an algorithm for it that terminates on all inputs. An undecidable problem is a problem that is not decidable.

Examples 

As noted above, every context-sensitive language is recursive. Thus, a simple example of a recursive language is the set L={abc, ...};
more formally, the set
  
is context-sensitive and therefore recursive.

Examples of decidable languages that are not context-sensitive are more difficult to describe. For one such example, some familiarity with mathematical logic is required: Presburger arithmetic is the first-order theory of the natural numbers with addition (but without multiplication). While the set of well-formed formulas in Presburger arithmetic is context-free, every deterministic Turing machine accepting the set of true statements in Presburger arithmetic has a worst-case runtime of at least , for some constant c>0 . Here, n denotes the length of the given formula. Since every context-sensitive language can be accepted by a linear bounded automaton, and such an automaton can be simulated by a deterministic Turing machine with worst-case running time at most  for some constant c , the set of valid formulas in Presburger arithmetic is not context-sensitive. On positive side, it is known that there is a deterministic Turing machine running in time at most triply exponential in n that decides the set of true formulas in Presburger arithmetic . Thus, this is an example of a language that is decidable but not context-sensitive.

Closure properties 

Recursive languages are closed under the following operations. That is, if L and P are two recursive languages, then the following languages are recursive as well:
 The Kleene star 
 The image φ(L) under an e-free homomorphism φ
 The concatenation 
 The union 
 The intersection 
 The complement of 
 The set difference 

The last property follows from the fact that the set difference can be expressed in terms of intersection and complement.

See also 
Recursively enumerable language
Computable set
Recursion

References 
 
 
 

Computability theory
Formal languages
Theory of computation
Recursion